The Yongan LNG Terminal is a liquefied natural gas (LNG) terminal at Yong'an District, Kaohsiung, Taiwan.

History
The operation of the terminal started in 1990 with 1.5 million tons capacity. The terminal was expanded to 4.0 million tons capacity during the second phase expansion which was completed in December 1996. It was then expanded again to 7.44 million tons capacity in the third phase of expansion which commenced in July 1996 and completed in December 2002.

Technical specifications
The terminal has a current capacity of 7.44 million tons annually.

See also
 List of LNG terminals

References

1990 establishments in Taiwan
Buildings and structures in Kaohsiung
Energy infrastructure completed in 1990
Liquefied natural gas terminals in Taiwan